J-STAGE (Japan Science Technology Information Aggregator, Electronic) is an electronic journal platform for Japanese academic journals, administered by the Japan Science and Technology Agency (JST).
It “supports the submission of manuscripts, peer‐reviewing, page‐layouting and dissemination of electronic journals” published in Japan.  The site provides free access to full text electronic journals, proceedings, and reports from various Japanese scientific societies.

It includes the Journal@rchive, an open access digital archive of Japanese journals, established in FY 2005 by the Government of Japan. By April 2009, some 540 academic organizations made use of the facility. As of February 2012, 1.68 million articles were available for download. To build the archive, in 2006 a robotic book scanner was introduced that could scan 1,200 pages per hour.

See also
 CiNii
 National Institute for Informatics

References

External links
J-STAGE

Bibliographic database providers
Open-access archives
Full-text scholarly online databases
Japanese studies
2005 establishments in Japan
Academic journal online publishing platforms